Lisa Barsotti is a research scientist at the Massachusetts Institute of Technology Kavli Institute.

Biography
She obtained her PhD from University of Pisa in 2006 on The control of the Virgo interferometer for gravitational wave detection and moved to the United States in 2007 to work on the Laser Interferometer Gravitational-wave Observatory (LIGO).

Barsotti was involved in the discovery of gravitiational waves reported in 2016.

She currently investigates technology to improve gravitational wave detection and led an upgrade to LIGO in 2017.

Honours and awards
2018 – Fellow of the American Physical Society for "extraordinary leadership in commissioning the Advanced LIGO detectors, improving their sensitivity through implementation of squeezed light, and enhancing the operation of the gravitational wave detector network through joint run planning between LIGO and Virgo"
2019 – Breakthrough New Horizons in Physics Prize
2019 – Capperuccio Prize of the city of Livorno
2021 – One of InspiringFifty in Italy

Selected publications

References

External links

Lisa Barsotti, "The Dawn of Gravitational Wave Astronomy"

Living people
Fellows of the American Physical Society
University of Pisa alumni
Massachusetts Institute of Technology faculty
Gravitational-wave astrophysicists
Women physicists
Year of birth missing (living people)